William Solomon may refer to:

 William Solomon (cricketer) (1872–1964), South African cricketer
 William Henry Solomon (1852–1930), judge of appeal and Chief Justice of South Africa
 William T. Solomon, American, former president, CEO and chairman of Austin Industries
 Will Solomon (born 1978), American basketball player